Gábor Zombori (born 8 October 2002) is a Hungarian swimmer. He competed in the men's 200 metre freestyle event at the 2020 European Aquatics Championships, in Budapest, Hungary.

References

External links
 

2002 births
Living people
Hungarian male swimmers
Hungarian male freestyle swimmers
Swimmers at the 2018 Summer Youth Olympics
Swimmers at the 2020 Summer Olympics
Olympic swimmers of Hungary
21st-century Hungarian people